The Ulster Hockey Union is the governing body for field hockey in Ulster. It is affiliated to Hockey Ireland. It organises a number of leagues and cup competitions for clubs and schools in the province. These include the Ulster Senior League, the Kirk Cup and the Ulster Shield. Over 70 clubs are  affiliated to the union.

Foundation
The modern Ulster Hockey Union was founded in May 2009 following the merger of the Ulster Branch of the Irish Hockey Association and the Ulster Women's Hockey Union. The UBIHA  was originally formed in December 1896. Founding members of the original association included the North Down, Cliftonville and Antrim hockey clubs. At a special general meeting on 15 October 1897 at the Royal Avenue Hotel, Belfast,  members of the association agreed to form the Ulster Senior League. The 1897–98 season also the introduction of the association's senior men's cup competition, the Kirk Cup.

Competitions

Men's
 Ulster Senior League
 Kirk Cup
 Anderson Cup

Women's
 Ulster Shield

Schoolboys
 Burney Cup
 McCullough Cup
 Richardson Cup

Schoolgirls
 Ulster Schoolgirls' Senior Cup

Representative players 
The Ulster Hockey Union also organises representative teams. They mainly play against teams representing the other provinces of Ireland. A number of Ireland, England and Great Britain internationals have also played for Ulster at interprovincial level.

Men

 Harry Cahill
 Mark Gleghorne
 David Judge 
 Iain Lewers
 Eugene Magee
 Stephen Martin
 Martin Sloan

 Harry Cahill
 Mark Gleghorne
 David Judge 
 Iain Lewers
 Stephen Martin
 Martin Sloan
 
 Mark Gleghorne
 Iain Lewers

Notes
 David Judge represented Ulster at schoolboy level.

Women
 
 Margaret Gleghorne
 Violet McBride
 Jackie McWilliams
 Maeve Kyle
 
 Margaret Gleghorne
 Violet McBride
 Jackie McWilliams

Personnel
 Stephen Martin worked for the union as a sports development manager from 1985 until 1991.
 Shirley McCay has worked as a coach for the union since 2013.
 Angela Platt served as the executive manager of the union from 2009 until 2017.

References

 
Hockey
Field hockey governing bodies in Ireland
1896 establishments in Ireland
Sports organizations established in 1896